"True to His Word" is a song recorded by American country music group Boy Howdy.  It was released in December 1994 as the first single from the album Born That Way.  The song reached #23 on the Billboard Hot Country Singles & Tracks chart.  The song was written by the band's lead singer Jeffrey Steele along with Chris Farren and Gary Harrison.

Chart performance

References

1995 singles
1994 songs
Boy Howdy songs
Songs written by Chris Farren (country musician)
Songs written by Gary Harrison
Songs written by Jeffrey Steele
Song recordings produced by Chris Farren (country musician)
Curb Records singles